Terence John Mulholland (born March 9, 1963) is an American former professional baseball pitcher. He threw left-handed and batted right-handed.

Early life and education
Mulholland was born in Uniontown, Pennsylvania. He attended Laurel Highlands High School in Uniontown, where he graduated in 1981. 

He attended Marietta College in Marietta, Ohio, where he majored in sports medicine and played for legendary NCAA Division III coach Don Schaly. He was a first team All-American his junior season when he was drafted in the first round by the San Francisco Giants.

Career

San Francisco Giants
Mulholland was drafted by the San Francisco Giants with the 24th overall pick in the 1984 MLB draft; he was chosen as a compensation pick from the Detroit Tigers for the signing of Darrell Evans. Mulholland made his Major League debut with the Giants on June 8, . After that, he played for eleven different Major League teams: the Giants, the Phillies, the Yankees, the Mariners, the Cubs, the Braves, the Dodgers, the Pirates, the Indians, the Twins, and the Diamondbacks.

He is well known for having one of the "nastiest" pickoff moves in the game.

While pitching for the Giants, Mulholland made a play that is often shown on sports bloopers shows. On September 3, 1986 against the New York Mets, Mulholland fielded a hard-hit ground ball hit by Keith Hernandez. However, the ball got stuck in the webbing of his glove. Mulholland then trotted towards first base and tossed his glove to first baseman Bob Brenly, who recorded the out.

Philadelphia Phillies
On June 18, the Giants traded Mulholland, Dennis Cook and Charlie Hayes for former Cy Young Award winner Steve Bedrosian and a player to be named later. On August 15, Mulholland no-hit the Giants 6-0 at Veterans Stadium. He faced the minimum of 27 batters. The only batter to reach base was on a throwing error by Hayes on Rick Parker's ground ball leading off the seventh inning; Parker was retired on Dave Anderson's double play ground ball one batter later. The 27th out was made by Hayes with a lunging catch of Gary Carter's line drive down the 3rd base line. He defeated Don Robinson, who also served up the 500th career home run to Phillies legend, Mike Schmidt, just three years earlier.

Mulholland was named the starter for the 1993 Major League Baseball All-Star Game. 

Mulholland started Game 6 for the Phillies in the 1993 World Series versus the Toronto Blue Jays. This game will always be remembered for Mitch Williams giving up the series-ending home run to Joe Carter. Mulholland was also the starting pitcher for the National League in the  All-Star Game played at Camden Yards in Baltimore, Maryland.

Chicago Cubs
Terry was instrumental in the Cubs'  playoff run, pitching in relief and as a starter, often on consecutive days.

Atlanta Braves
At the 1999 trading deadline, the Braves acquired Mulholland along with infielder José Hernández from the Chicago Cubs for Micah Bowie, Rubén Quevedo and a player to be named later. He appeared in 16 games down the stretch with the Braves, going 4-2 with an ERA of 2.98, during a season that the Braves went to the World Series. The next season, Mulholland was used as a spot starter for the Braves, and went 9-9 with a 5.11 ERA in 156.7 innings of work. He became a free agent after the season ended.

Minnesota Twins
While pitching for the Minnesota Twins Mulholland became one of the few players who have beaten every Major League team.

Arizona Diamondbacks
On June 21, the Diamondbacks waived Mulholland.

Personal life
Mulholland lists baseball card collecting as one of his hobbies.

See also
 List of Major League Baseball no-hitters

References

External links

Terry Mulholland at SABR (Baseball BioProject)
Terry Mulholland at Baseball Almanac

1963 births
Living people
Arizona Diamondbacks players
San Francisco Giants players
Philadelphia Phillies players
New York Yankees players
Seattle Mariners players
Chicago Cubs players
Atlanta Braves players
Los Angeles Dodgers players
Pittsburgh Pirates players
Cleveland Indians players
Minnesota Twins players
Major League Baseball pitchers
Baseball players from Pennsylvania
Marietta Pioneers baseball players
National League All-Stars
Fresno Giants players
Everett Giants players
Shreveport Captains players
Phoenix Firebirds players
Scranton/Wilkes-Barre Red Barons players
Altoona Curve players
Tucson Sidewinders players
People from Uniontown, Pennsylvania